Erika Suchovská (born 27 July 1967 in Hodonín) is a retired Czech athlete who competed primarily in the 200 metres. She won the silver medal in that event at the 1996 European Indoor Championships. In addition, she represented her country at the 1995 World Championships.

Competition record

Personal bests
Outdoor
100 metres – 11.34 (+2.0 m/s) (Lisbon 1996)
200 metres – 22.96 (Saint-Peterburg 1998)
Indoor
60 metres – 7.42 (Karlsruhe 1999)
200 metres – 23.16 (Stockholm 1996)

References

1967 births
Living people
Czech female sprinters
People from Hodonín
Sportspeople from the South Moravian Region